The Battle of Jaguarão was fought in the town of Jaguarão in the then province of Rio Grande do Sul, on 27 January 1865, between the Imperial Brazilian Army and a Uruguayan militia during the Uruguayan War.

References

Conflicts in 1865
Battles involving Brazil
Battles involving Uruguay
History of South America
Military history of Brazil
Wars involving Uruguay
Jaguarão
January 1865 events
Battles of the Uruguayan War
History of Rio Grande do Sul